Nicole Evangeline Lilly (born 3 August 1979) is a Canadian actress and author. She is the recipient of various accolades including a Screen Actors Guild Award and an MTV Movie Award. She has also received nominations for a Golden Globe Award, a Critics' Choice Movie Award, 9 Saturn Awards, an Empire Award and 10 Teen Choice Awards.

She gained popular acclaim for her first leading role as Kate Austen in the ABC series Lost (2004–2010), which garnered her the nomination for the Golden Globe Award for Best Actress in a Drama Series and won her a Screen Actors Guild Award. In 2008, she starred as Connie James in the Academy Award–winning war film The Hurt Locker (2008). She followed this with roles in Real Steel (2011), Little Evil (2017), Crisis (2021) and South of Heaven (2021). Lilly is also the author of a children's book series, The Squickerwonkers.

Lilly starred as Tauriel in Peter Jackson's The Hobbit film series, appearing in The Desolation of Smaug (2013) and The Battle of the Five Armies (2014). She has portrayed the superhero Wasp in the Marvel Cinematic Universe, beginning with Ant-Man (2015) and most recently starring in Ant-Man and the Wasp: Quantumania (2023).

Early life 
Lilly was born in Fort Saskatchewan in Alberta on 3 August 1979. She was raised in British Columbia by her mother, a produce manager, and her father, a home economics teacher. She has both an older sister and a younger sister.

Lilly graduated from W. J. Mouat Secondary School in Abbotsford, British Columbia; she played soccer and was vice president of the student council. In university, she was a waitress, did "oil changes and grease jobs on big rig trucks", and was a flight attendant for Royal Airlines to pay for her tuition. Her interest in humanitarian causes and world development led her to major in International Relations at the University of British Columbia.

Career

2002–2003: Early career
Lilly's acting career began when she was discovered by a Ford Modelling Agency agent while passing the time in Kelowna, British Columbia. She took the agent's business card but did not immediately pursue acting. She eventually called and the agency landed her several roles in commercials and non-speaking parts in the TV shows Smallville and Kingdom Hospital. She was also on a video game news and review show on the gaming television channel G4TV.

2004–2007: Breakthrough with Lost

In late 2003, Lilly was encouraged by a friend to audition for ABC's Lost and did not expect to be cast. The secrecy campaign meant auditioning actors could not see the full script, could read only short scenes, and knew only the basic premise of people surviving a plane crash on a tropical island. It reminded Lilly of The Blue Lagoon, and she thought Lost would "at best be a mediocre TV show". Around 75 women auditioned for the part of Kate Austen. Writer and co-creator Damon Lindelof said that he and executive producer and co-creator J. J. Abrams "...were fast-forwarding through a tape and he saw her and said: 'That's the girl!'" The character almost had to be recast, as Lilly had trouble acquiring a work visa to enter the United States. Her application was finally accepted after nearly 20 tries and she arrived in Hawaii for filming one day late.

Lost ran for six seasons, from 2004 to 2010. It was one of ABC's top primetime shows, winning one Golden Globe Award and ten Primetime Emmy Awards, including Outstanding Drama Series in 2005, and was ranked the top-rated TV show of the decade by IMDb. Lilly, who was from 24 to 30 years of age during the show's run, appeared in 108 of 121 episodes, and her character, Kate Austen, was the show's female lead. In 2006 she was nominated for a Golden Globe Award for Best Actress – Television Series Drama. Robert Bianco of USA Today praised Lilly's performance in the episode "Eggtown", saying it was almost worthy of a Primetime Emmy Award for Outstanding Lead Actress in a Drama Series nomination. After shooting the final episode of Lost, Lilly said she was considering taking a break from acting to focus on her charity and humanitarian efforts. She told Vulture: "I consider acting a day job—it's not my dream; it's not my be-all, end-all." She says she uses her high-profile roles to further her humanitarian efforts, not to achieve stardom.

2008–present: Established actress

In 2008, Lilly appeared in the film The Hurt Locker, directed by Kathryn Bigelow. The film received widespread acclaim and went on to be nominated in nine categories at the 82nd Academy Awards, winning six of these including Best Picture. Lilly and the cast won the Gotham Independent Film Award for Best Ensemble Cast and the Washington D.C. Area Film Critics Association Award for Best Ensemble. That same year, Lilly had a leading role in the psychological thriller film Afterwards.

On 11 May 2010, Lilly announced on The View that being a mother was her top priority, but that she liked acting as a "day job" and would continue it when possible. She took a short hiatus that year and was not in contact with Hollywood. 

In 2011, despite turning down a number of film offers, Lilly appeared as Bailey Tallet, a boxing gym owner, in Real Steel alongside Hugh Jackman. She accepted the role after director Shawn Levy sent her the script. Levy noted that Lilly was "magnificent to look" and that he "needed someone who you believed had grown up in a man's world; Bailey needed to have a strength and a toughness that was not at the expense of her being womanly". During promotion for the film, Lilly turned down a role in the X-Men franchise from Jackman, noting that she "wasn't into superhero movies" at the time. The film went on to be nominated for Best Visual Effects at the 84th Academy Awards.

In 2012, Lilly was cast as the Mirkwood elf Tauriel in Peter Jackson's three-part adaptation of J. R. R. Tolkien's The Hobbit. The character, which does not appear in the original book by Tolkien, was created by Peter Jackson and Fran Walsh as the head of the Elven guard. For the role, Lilly underwent training for swordplay, archery and speaking the Elvish language. Lilly described Tauriel as a nonconformist, noting that she tends to "rebel against the established social order of the Elves". Lilly appeared as the character in The Hobbit: The Desolation of Smaug (2013) and its sequel, The Hobbit: The Battle of the Five Armies (2014).

In 2015, Lilly played Hope van Dyne, daughter of Hank Pym and Janet van Dyne in the superhero film Ant-Man. Lilly described her character as "capable, strong, and kick-ass", but said that being raised by two superheroes resulted in Hope being "a pretty screwed up human being [...] and the clear message sent by my name is that I'm not a big fan of my father and so I took my mother's name." Lilly also signed a multi-film contract with Marvel. The film received generally positive reviews.

In 2017, Lilly starred in the Netflix horror film, Little Evil alongside Adam Scott. In 2018, she reprised her role as van Dyne in Ant-Man and the Wasp (2018), donning the superhero mantle of the Wasp which had been teased in the first film during an end credits scene. The film received generally positive reviews with Lilly's performance being praised. The Wasp became first superheroine to be a titular character in a MCU film. In 2019, Lilly also reprised her role in Avengers: Endgame (2019). 

In 2021, she starred with Armie Hammer and Gary Oldman in Crisis, directed by Nicholas Jarecki. That same year, she also starred in South of Heaven alongside Jason Sudeikis and Mike Colter. The latter won her Best Actress at the AFIN International Film Festival. Lilly also voiced an alternate version of the Wasp in the Disney+ animated series What If...? (2021). She voiced van Dyne in the episode "What If... Zombies?!", and received positive reviews.

In February 2023, Lilly reprised her role as Hope van Dyne / Wasp in Ant-Man and the Wasp: Quantumania, released as the first film of Phase Five of the MCU. That same month, it was announced that Lilly would voice a character in the English version of the animated historic epic Israeli film, Legend of Destruction, which was originally released in 2021 in Hebrew. Lilly is set to voice the "last Jewish queen, Berenice of Cilicia, who did her best to protect her people [...] even at the cost of her life", in which Lilly noted was "really brutal and sad, but it's true".

In the media

Public image
After gaining recognition for her role as Kate Austen in Lost, Lilly began to appear in the media and was regularly included in "Most Beautiful" lists. Entertainment Weekly voted Lilly one of its "Breakout Stars of 2004". That same year, Lilly was voted one of People "50 Most Beautiful People". In 2007, her portrayal of Austen was voted the number one "Sexiest Woman on Television" by TV Guide and made FHM Top Sexiest.

Lilly is noted for playing "strong, tragic, and even a bit snarky" characters. Lilly's roles in The Hobbit film series and the Marvel Cinematic Universe as Tauriel and Hope van Dyne / Wasp respectively, have received critical acclaim.
 For her performance as Tauriel, Lilly was nominated for the Saturn Award for Best Supporting Actress, the Broadcast Film Critics Association Award for Best Actress in an Action Movie, the Empire Award for Best Supporting Actress, and a Kid's Choice Award for Favorite Female Buttkicker.

Charity work
Lilly works with non-profits such as the GO Campaign. In 2009, Lilly auctioned off custom lingerie in support of Task Brasil, "a non-profit organization dedicated to helping the lost street children of Brazil by providing them secure housing". In 2010, she auctioned off three lunches in Vancouver, Honolulu, and Los Angeles to help widows and orphans in Rwanda, a country she has made numerous trips to as part of her charity work. In 2012, Lilly auctioned off a Hawaiian hike to raise money for the Sierra Club.

Other ventures

The Squickerwonkers 
On 18 July 2013, Lilly debuted her book series, titled The Squickerwonkers at the San Diego Comic-Con centred around a young girl who joins a group of characters described as a "family" who are all "strange outcasts" and have "very particular vices". 

In 2014, Titan Books released the first title of The Squickerwonkers titled The Squickerwonkers: The Prequel (2014) with the foreword written by Peter Jackson. Three main titles titled The Squickerwonkers, Act 1: The Demise of Selma the Spoiled (2018), The Squickerwonkers, Act 2: The Demise of Lorna the Lazy (2018) and The Squickerwonkers, Act 3: The Demise of Andy the Arrogant (2019) were self-published by Quiet Cocoon Productions with Rodrigo Bastos Didier taking over as illustrator. Lilly has stated that her literary inspirations are Roald Dahl and Edward Gorey.

Personal life
Lilly was married to Murray Hone from 2003 to 2004. She was in a relationship with her Lost costar Dominic Monaghan from 2004 to 2007. In 2010, Lilly began a long-term relationship with Norman Kali. She gave birth to their first child, a son, in 2011. Their second child, another son, was born in October 2015.

Lilly is a Christian, and she has stated that her religion was what influenced her to visit the Philippines at age 18.

On 20 December 2006, an electrical problem set fire to Lilly's house in Kailua, Hawaii, destroying the house and all of her possessions while she was on the set of Lost. Though she lost all of her belongings, she said that the fire was "almost liberating" and that she was "in no hurry to clutter up [her] life again".

Covid-19 stance
On 16 March 2020, Lilly received mixed responses when she refused to self-quarantine during the COVID-19 pandemic, said it was "business as usual" on Instagram, and claimed that she values "freedom over [her] life". On 26 March, she apologized for her comments and called them "dismissive, arrogant, and cryptic". On 27 January 2022, she posted a photo on Instagram showing that she had taken part in a march against COVID-19 vaccine mandates in Washington, D.C. and said that "nobody should ever be forced to inject their body with anything, against their will". On 18 February, amidst the Canada convoy protest against federal vaccine mandates, she urged Canadian Prime Minister Justin Trudeau to meet with the protestors.

Filmography

Film

Television

Video-games

Theme-park-attractions

Awards and nominations

References

Works cited

External links

 
 
 
 

1979 births
21st-century Canadian actresses
Actresses from Alberta
Canadian Christians
Canadian expatriate actresses in the United States
Canadian expatriates in New Zealand
Canadian film actresses
Canadian people of Irish descent
Canadian television actresses
Female models from Alberta
Living people
People from Fort Saskatchewan
University of British Columbia alumni